People's Liberation War may refer to:
 People's Liberation War (Yugoslavia), conflict in occupied World War II Yugoslavia, resulting in the establishment of the Yugoslav Federation
 National Liberation War of Macedonia, a sub-conflict of the Yugoslav People's Liberation War
 last three years of the Chinese Civil War, referred to in the People's Republic of China as the "People's Liberation War"
 Korean War, referred to in North Korea as the "People's Liberation War"
 Vietnam War, esp. the southern campaigns by the Viet Cong, referred to in Vietnam was the "War of People's Liberation"
 Greek Civil War, sometimes referred to as the People's Liberation War by Greek communists